There were three special elections to the United States House of Representatives in 2005 during the 109th United States Congress.

Summary 

Elections are listed by date and district.

|-
! 
| Bob Matsui
|  | Democratic
| 1978
|  | Incumbent died January 1, 2005.New member elected March 8, 2005.Democratic hold.
| nowrap | 
|-
! 
| Rob Portman
|  | Republican
| 1992
|  | Incumbent resigned April 29, 2005 to become U.S. Trade Representative.New member elected August 2, 2005.Republican hold.
| nowrap | 
|-
! 
| Christopher Cox
|  | Republican
| 2002
|  | Incumbent resigned August 2, 2005 to become Chairman of the U.S. Securities and Exchange Commission.New member elected December 7, 2005.Republican hold.
| nowrap | 
|}

California's 5th congressional district

Ohio's 2nd congressional district

California's 48th congressional district

References 

 
2005